Chornukhyne is an urban-type settlement in Alchevsk Raion of Luhansk Oblast in eastern Ukraine, but was formerly in Popasna Raion and then Perevalsk Raion. In the 2001 Ukrainian census, the town's population was 7,782. The current population estimate is 

The Kalmius and Chornukha Rivers flow through the town.

History
The territory was first settled in 1600 as the Chornukhynskyi Post of the Kalmius Palanka of the Zaporizhian Sich cossack territory. In 1778, the settlement was a sloboda, and in 1892 it became a village. It was granted the status of an urban-type settlement in 1938.

On 7 October 2014, to facilitate the governance of Luhansk Oblast, the Verkhovna Rada made some changes in the administrative divisions, so that the localities in the government-controlled areas were grouped into districts. In particular, Chornukhyne was transferred from Perevalsk Raion to Popasna Raion. However, on 20 February 2015, forces of the de facto Luhansk People's Republic retook Chornukhyne as a result of the Battle of Debaltseve. Chornukhyne has since then been administered as a part of Perevalsk Raion.

See also
Repellent-1

References

External links
 Luhansk topographic map 1:100 000

Urban-type settlements in Alchevsk Raion
Perevalsk Raion
Slavyanoserbsky Uyezd